"Fragments" is a song by American singer Jack Johnson and was released on February 17, 2017. The song is featured in the short film "Smog of the Sea," and is also the tenth track on Jack's seventh studio album, All the Light Above It Too.

Release 
The song was released on February 17, 2017, along with the release of the short film documentary, "Smog of the Sea." The song is featured in this film which features a one-week journey through the Sargasso Sea. Along with the release of the song, he announced his 2017 Tour, and plans to release a new album in the summer.

Composition 
Johnson says that he wrote the song about the pollution in the ocean, and that the "Smog of the Sea" documentary inspired him to write the song. The main meaning of this song, is to be cautious to our environment. The trip also inspired many other of his new songs from his album "All the Light Above it Too." Johnson had almost completely finished all of the songs by the end of the trip and was ready to put them into a record.

Live performance 
The song has been performed during Jack's "All the Light Above it Too Tour" multiple times, along with "My Mind Is for Sale."

References 

Jack Johnson (musician) songs
2017 songs
2017 singles
Songs written by Jack Johnson (musician)
Rock ballads